Broadley's dwarf gecko (Lygodactylus broadleyi) is a species of lizard in the family Gekkonidae. The species is native to East Africa.

Etymology
The specific name, broadleyi, is in honor of African herpetologist Donald George Broadley.

Geographic range
L. broadleyi is found in Kenya and Tanzania.

Description

Reproduction
L. broadleyi is oviparous.

References

Further reading
Pasteur G (1995). "Biodiversité et reptiles: diagnoses de sept nouvelles espèces fossiles et actuelles du genre de lezards Lygodactylus (Sauria, Gekkonidae)". Dumerilia 2:1-21. (Lygodactylus broadleyi, new species). (in French).
Rösler H (2000). "Kommentierte Liste der rezent, subrezent und fossil bekannten Geckotaxa (Reptilia: Gekkonomorpha)". Gekkota 2: 28–153. (Lygodactylus broadleyi, p. 92). (in German).
Spawls S, Howell K, Hinkel H, Menegon M (2018). Field Guide to East African Reptiles, Second Edition. London: Bloomsbury Natural History. 624 pp. . (Lygodactylus broadleyi, p. 101).

External links
https://web.archive.org/web/20070929013959/http://www.zooinstitutes.com/Zoology/continents.asp?name=AFRICA

Lygodactylus
Reptiles described in 1995